The Stanford Cardinal softball team represents Stanford University in NCAA Division I college softball.  The team participates in the Pac-12 Conference. The Cardinal are currently led by head coach Jessica Allister. The team plays its home games at Boyd & Jill Smith Family Stadium located on the university's campus.

History

Coaching history

Championships

Conference Championships

Coaching staff

Head coaching record
Sources:

Notable players

National awards
USA Softball Collegiate Player of the Year
Ashley Hansen (2011)

Conference awards
Pac-12 Player of the Year
Jessica Mendoza (2000)
Ashley Hansen (2011)

Pac-12 Freshman of the Year
Jessica Mendoza (1999)
Ashley Hansen (2009)
Kayla Bonstrom (2013)

Pac-12 Defensive Player of the Year
Lauren Lappin (2005, 2006)
Rosey Neill (2008, 2009, 2010)
Ashley Hansen (2012)

Pac-12 Coach of the Year
John Rittman (2001, 2004)
Jessica Allister (2019)

References